Hauteville is a commune in the Pas-de-Calais department in the Hauts-de-France region of France.

Geography

Population

Places of interest
 The 19th-century chateau
 The church of St. Christophe, dating from the 16th century

See also
 Communes of the Pas-de-Calais department

References

External links

 Hauteville on the Quid website 

Communes of Pas-de-Calais